Semen Ari is a woreda in Southern Nations, Nationalities, and Peoples' Region in Ethiopia.

See also 

 Districts of Ethiopia

References 

Districts of the Southern Nations, Nationalities, and Peoples' Region